Halita is a Nigerian drama series set in Northern Nigeria. It has Chisom Gabriella in the leading role as the eponymous Halita and also stars Ummi Ahmed, Boma Ilamina-Eremie and Eddy Madaki. It premiered on Africa Magic Family, DStv channel 154 and GOtv channel 2 on February 4, 2019.

Plot summary
Halita is the story of a 19-year-old village girl who is forced to leave the village in order to send money home when her mother Rebecca, takes ill. She is promised a job as a secretary but by fate, she ends up in the Zamani home and her fortunes take a turn.

Cast and characters
Chisom Gabriella Agoawuike as Halita

Ummi Ahmed as Matilda Rishante

Boma Ilamina-Eremie as Sarki 'King' Zamani

Bassey Ekpo Bassey as Kaza Zamani

David Adoga as Bobai Zamani

Patrick Otoro as Dabot, Halita’s father

Tosan Edremoda Ugbeye as Uwani Rishante

Mofe Duncan as Adi Rishante

Eddie Madaki as Hassan

Onyinye Ezekwe as Dosha Zamani

Matt Alkali as Dareng

Sophie Alakija as Altine

Production and release
At a media screening of the first episode in Lagos, the Channel Director of Africa Magic described Halita as a tale of family, fortune and fame. It streams on Showmax and was listed as one of the most streamed shows of 2020.

Matt Alkali died while filming on set on 24 March 2020.

References

Nigerian television soap operas
2019 Nigerian television series debuts
Africa Magic original programming